William Comyn, Lord of Kilbride was a son of David Comyn and Isobel de Valognes. Sheriff of Ayr in 1263, he died in 1283.

Life
William was a son of David Comyn, Lord of Kilbride and Isabel de Valognes. William was the Sheriff of Ayr in 1263 - 1265. He succeeded upon his father's death, as Lord of Kilbride in 1247.

Marriage and issue
William married Euphemia, the daughter of Roger FitzJohn, Lord of Warkworth and Clavering and Isabel de Dunbar, they had the following known issue:
John (d.c. 1290), without issue.
Edmund, married Maria, had issue.

Citations

References
Taylor, Alice. The Shape of the State in Medieval Scotland, 1124-1290 - Oxford Studies In Medieval European History, Oxford University Press, 2016. .

Year of birth unknown
1283 deaths